Dawson is a stop on the Luas light-rail tram system in Dublin, Ireland.  It opened in 2017 as the first stop on Luas Cross City, an extension of the Green Line through the city centre from St. Stephen's Green to Broombridge.  It is located on Dawson Street and provides access to the Grafton Street shopping district, the seat of the legislature at Leinster House on Kildare Street, St. Ann's Church, the Kerlin Gallery, Mansion House (the Lord Mayor's residence), and the National Library of Ireland. Its side platforms are integrated into the pavement.

References

Luas Green Line stops in Dublin (city)
Railway stations opened in 2017
2017 establishments in Ireland
Railway stations in the Republic of Ireland opened in the 21st century